Calum Worthy (born January 28, 1991) is a Canadian actor, writer, and producer, known for his roles as Dez on the Disney Channel series Austin & Ally, Alex Trimboli in the Netflix series American Vandal, Nicholas Godejohn in the Hulu series The Act, and himself in The Coppertop Flop Show. He has won two Young Artist Awards in the Leading Young Actor category for his performances in the comedy film National Lampoon's Thanksgiving Family Reunion (2003) and the science fiction television series Stormworld (2009). He also won the Leading Actor award at the 2010 Leo Awards for his performance in Stormworld. 

Worthy has guest-starred in numerous television series, including ABC Family's Kyle XY, The CW's Supernatural and Smallville, CTV's Flashpoint, The Hub's R. L. Stine's The Haunting Hour: The Series, Disney Channel's Good Luck Charlie, Disney XD's Zeke and Luther, and Two and a Half Men.

Life and career
Worthy was born January 28, 1991, to Sandra Webster Worthy and David Worthy, in Victoria, British Columbia. He made his screen debut at the age of 9, guest-starring in Fox's Night Visions (directed by Bill Pullman). At the age of 10, he starred in the three-episode British miniseries I Was a Rat. He has since completed more than 50 film and TV projects, and has worked in five countries—Canada, United States, Australia, the United Kingdom, and Singapore. He won two Young Artist Awards for Leading Young Actor in 2004 and 2010, while receiving a nomination for Best Performance in a Short Film – Young Actor for When Jesse Was Born in 2006. He also won a Leo Award for Best Performance in a Youth or Children's Program or Series in 2010.

Worthy resided in Los Angeles, California, while a series regular on the Disney Channel series Austin & Ally in which he has written one episode. In 2013, he created, wrote, and executive produced—along with Derek Baynham and Kelly May—the sketch comedy series The Coppertop Flop Show, which was picked up by Disney Channel to air in late 2013.

Worthy stated that when he had free time from filming Austin & Ally, he attended university. He also stated that when he has free time, he enjoys making sketches with friends.

In July 2017 Worthy was cast as Robbie Baldwin / Speedball in Freeform's upcoming New Warriors television series. The series was ultimately not picked up.

In 2018, Calum played Alex Trimboli in the first season of Netflix's American Vandal. In 2019, he played Nicholas Godejohn in the first season of The Act.

In February 2021, it was announced that Worthy had been cast as Jasper in the upcoming Netflix thriller series Pieces of Her, which is adapted from the Karin Slaughter novel of the same name.

Filmography

Awards and nominations

References

External links

 
 

1991 births
21st-century Canadian male actors
Canadian expatriate male actors in the United States
Canadian male child actors
Canadian male film actors
Canadian male television actors
Living people
Male actors from Victoria, British Columbia